The 1983 Philadelphia Eagles season was their 51st in the National Football League (NFL). The team followed up their record of 3–6 during the strike-shortened 1982 season with another losing campaign. The team failed to qualify for the playoffs for the second straight season. The Eagles started off winning four of their first six games, before losing seven consecutive games. The Eagles finished in fourth place with a 5–11 record. Despite the disappointing season, second year wide receiver Mike Quick established himself as a new star by collecting 1,409 receiving yards.

Offseason

NFL draft

Personnel

Staff

Roster

Schedule 

Note: Intra-division opponents are in bold text.

The October 16 and November 6 games against the Dallas Cowboys were played with their locations switched from the original schedule, because of the October 16 conflict with the Phillies' game 5 of the 1983 World Series.

Game summaries

Week 1

Week 2

Week 3

Week 4

Week 5

Week 6

Week 7

Week 8

Week 9

Week 10

Week 11

Week 12

Week 13

Week 14

Week 15

Week 16

Standings

Awards and honors 
 Mike Quick, 1983 Pro Bowl selection
 Mike Quick, Associated Press first-team All-Pro selection 1983

References

External links 
 1983 Philadelphia Eagles at Pro-Football-Reference.com

Philadelphia Eagles seasons
Philadelphia Eagles
Philadelphia Eagles